Law and Disorder in Philadelphia (also titled Killadelphia) is a 2008 British documentary by Louis Theroux.

Theroux investigates the high crime rates in one of the United States' largest cities, Philadelphia, mainly from the perspective of the local police as well as people affected by, and possibly involved in, crime in the city's low-income neighborhoods.

Reception

The programme was met with a mixed response. The Independent said "It was a fascinating film, though, in part because of the utter dereliction of this particular patch of the inner city, but also because it confirmed that The Wire had, if anything, understated its portrait of civil breakdown."

The Times described it as "It was a depressing tour streaked with black humour but Theroux seemed out of depth analysing what he saw. He is at his best getting to know and under the skin of his subjects."

See also 
 Crime in Philadelphia

References

Louis Theroux's BBC Two specials
BBC television documentaries
2008 television specials
Documentary films about Philadelphia
Crime in Philadelphia
Fictional portrayals of the Philadelphia Police Department
Television episodes set in Philadelphia
BBC travel television series